Theresa Chewe (born 27 November 1997) is a Zambian footballer who plays as a forward for Red Arrows FC and the Zambia women's national team.

References

1997 births
Living people
Women's association football forwards
Zambian women's footballers
Zambia women's international footballers
Red Arrows F.C. players